Makoto Ueda may refer to:

, writer on Japanese poetry
, writer on collective housing